Electoral history of Mike Huckabee, Republican politician and 44th Governor of Arkansas.

References

Huckabee, Mike
Mike Huckabee
Huckabee, Mike